Torri in Sabina is a  (municipality) in the Province of Rieti in the Italian region of Latium, located about  north of Rome and about  southwest of Rieti. Located on a ridge of the Monti Sabini, it is part of the Sabina traditional region.

The interior has a single nave and houses a 13th-14th century fresco of the Universal Judgement and scenes from the Old and New Testament.

References

Cities and towns in Lazio